Kalyan Chatterjee  ,  is an Indian actor recognized for his work in Bengali cinema, and considered to be one of the most famous supporting actors of Bengali Cinema. He has acted in more than 400 Bengali films. He works with actors like Sabitri Chatterjee, Ranjit Mallick, Uttam Kumar, Soumitra Chatterjee, Santu Mukhopadhyay and Dipankar Dey.

Career 
His first film  Apanjan was released in 1968. He acted in about more than 400 films portraying the role of a typical Bengali man and was acclaimed by viewers for his natural acting skill. He portrayed characters of different shades in ' Dhonni Meye  ' (1971), '  Sagina' (1974), He was a favourite actor of director Arabinda Mukhopadhyay.

Selected filmography

References

External links

20th-century Indian actors
Male actors from West Bengal
1947 births
Living people